Widdringtonia schwarzii (Willowmore cedar or Willowmore cypress) is a species of Widdringtonia native to South Africa, where it is endemic to the Baviaanskloof and Kouga Mountains west of Port Elizabeth in Eastern Cape Province; it occurs on dry rocky slopes and crags at 600-1,200 m altitude. It is threatened by habitat loss, particularly by wildfire. The Willowmore cypress is a protected tree in South Africa.

It is a medium-sized evergreen tree growing to 20–25 m (formerly known to 40 m) tall. The leaves are scale-like, 1.5 mm long and 1 mm broad on small shoots, up to 10 mm long on strong-growing shoots, and arranged in opposite decussate pairs. The cones are globose to rectangular, 2–3 cm long, with four scales. It is closely related to Widdringtonia wallichii from Western Cape Province, being most easily distinguished by its larger seeds with a short seedwing.

References
Notes

Sources

schwarzii
Afromontane flora
Protected trees of South Africa
Vulnerable plants
Taxonomy articles created by Polbot